The 1917–18 Swiss National Ice Hockey Championship was the eighth edition of the national ice hockey championship in Switzerland. HC Bern won the championship by defeating HC Rosey Gstaad in the final.

First round

Eastern Series 
HC Bern qualified for the final.

Western Series

Final 
 HC Bern - HC Rosey Gstaad 1:0

External links 
Swiss Ice Hockey Federation – All-time results

National
Swiss National Ice Hockey Championship seasons